Country Television Services Limited, formerly Country Broadcasting Services was an Australian media company, wholly owning two television stations, CBN-8 Orange and CWN-6 Dubbo (now Prime7), as well as stakes in several others (NTD-8 Darwin being one of them), and two radio stations, 2NZ Inverell and 2GZ Orange.

References

Defunct broadcasting companies of Australia